Douglas County is a county located at the northwest corner of the U.S. state of Wisconsin. As of the 2020 census,  the population was 44,295  Its county seat is Superior. Douglas County is included in the Duluth, MN-WI Metropolitan Statistical Area.

History
Douglas County, named after Illinois Senator Stephen A. Douglas, was established on February 8, 1854, from the larger La Pointe County, Wisconsin, and the City of Superior was immediately selected as the county seat.

In Wisconsin's 1952 U.S. Senate primary, Douglas County was one of two counties (out of 71 in the state at the time) that Sen. Joe McCarthy did not carry.

Geography

A portion of the Fond du Lac Indian Reservation is located within Douglas County.

Adjacent counties

 Bayfield County – east
 Sawyer County – southeast
 Washburn County – south
 Burnett County – southwest
 Pine County, Minnesota – southwest
 Carlton County, Minnesota – west
 Saint Louis County, Minnesota – northwest
 Lake County, Minnesota - northeast

Major highways

Railroads
BNSF
Canadian National
Canadian Pacific
Union Pacific

Buses
Duluth Transit Authority
List of intercity bus stops in Wisconsin

Airports
 Solon Springs Municipal Airport (KOLG) serves the county and surrounding communities.
 Richard I. Bong Airport (KSUW)

National protected area
 Saint Croix National Scenic Riverway (part)

Demographics

2020 census
As of the census of 2020, the population was 44,295. The racial makeup of the county was 89.7% White, 1.8% Native American, 1.3% Black or African American, 0.6% Asian, 0.6% from other races, and 5.9% from two or more races. Ethnically, the population was 1.7% Hispanic or Latino of any race.

2010 census
As of the 2010 United States Census, there were 44,159 people living in the county. 93.2% were White, 2.0% Native American, 1.1% Black or African American, 0.9% Asian, 0.2% of some other race and 2.7% of two or more races. 1.1% were Hispanic or Latino (of any race). 20.7% were of German, 11.2% Norwegian, 9.7% Swedish, 7.8% Irish, 6.4% Finnish and 6.1% Polish ancestry.

2000 census

As of the census of 2000, there were 43,287 people, 17,808 households, and 11,272 families living in the county. The population density was 33 people per square mile (13/km2). There were 20,356 housing units at an average density of 16 per square mile (6/km2). The racial makeup of the county was 95.35% White, 0.57% Black or African American, 1.82% Native American, 0.63% Asian, 0.03% Pacific Islander, 0.20% from other races, and 1.41% from two or more races. 0.73% of the population were Hispanic or Latino of any race. 17.8% had German, 13.5% Norwegian, 11.5% Swedish, 8.5% Irish, 8.2% Finnish, 6.8% Polish and 5.1% United States or American ancestry. 96.7% spoke English and 1.2% Spanish as their first language.

There were 17,808 households, out of which 29.20% had children under the age of 18 living with them, 49.10% were married couples living together, 10.10% had a female householder with no husband present, and 36.70% were non-families. 29.80% of all households were made up of individuals, and 12.00% had someone living alone who was 65 years of age or older. The average household size was 2.36 and the average family size was 2.93.

In the county, the population was spread out, with 23.60% under the age of 18, 10.30% from 18 to 24, 28.00% from 25 to 44, 23.60% from 45 to 64, and 14.50% who were 65 years of age or older. The median age was 38 years. For every 100 females there were 97.20 males. For every 100 females age 18 and over, there were 94.40 males.

In 2017, there were 413 births, giving a general fertility rate of 50.8 births per 1000 women aged 15–44, the seventh lowest rate out of all 72 Wisconsin counties. Additionally, there were no reported induced abortions performed on women of Douglas County residence in 2017.

Communities

City
 Superior (county seat)

Villages
 Lake Nebagamon
 Oliver
 Poplar
 Solon Springs
 Superior

Towns

 Amnicon
 Bennett
 Brule
 Cloverland
 Dairyland
 Gordon
 Hawthorne
 Highland
 Lakeside
 Maple
 Oakland
 Parkland
 Solon Springs
 Summit
 Superior
 Wascott

Census-designated places
 Brule
 Gordon

Unincorporated communities

 Ambridge
 Amnicon Falls
 Anton
 Beebe
 Bellwood
 Bennett
 Black River
 Blueberry
 Borea
 Boylston
 Boylston Junction
 Carnegie
 Chaffey
 Cloverland
 Cozy Corner
 Cutter
 Dairyland
 Dedham
 Dewey
 Dobie
 Four Corners
 Foxboro
 Hawthorne
 Hillcrest
 Hines
 Maple
 Middle River
 Moose Junction
 Parkland
 Patzau
 Peyton
 Pokegama
 Riverview
 Rockmont
 Saunders
 Sauntry
 South Itasca
 South Range
 Sunnyside
 Waino
 Wascott
 Wentworth
 Winneboujou

Ghost towns

 Merriam
 Millcrest
 Morrison (Allouez) (annexed by the City of Superior)
 New Bristol (Martinson)
 Nutt
 Pokegama Junction
 Steele
 Troy
 Walbridge
 Way
 Wiehe

Politics
Douglas County has one of the longest Democratic voting streaks in the nation in presidential elections; the last Republican presidential candidate to win Douglas County was Herbert Hoover in 1928. However, in 2020, Donald Trump received the highest percent of Douglas County's vote for a Republican since 1952, signaling a new competitiveness in the county. In every Presidential election between 1984 and 2000, the county was always the second most Democratic in the state (behind only Native American-dominated Menominee County), before being surpassed by Dane County in 2004, and several others from 2008 onwards.

Douglas County also regularly supports Democrat candidates at the state level.

See also
 National Register of Historic Places listings in Douglas County, Wisconsin
 Pokegama Bay

References

External links
 Douglas County website
 Superior–Douglas County Convention and Visitors Bureau
 Superior–Douglas County Chamber of Commerce
 Map of Douglas County, Wisconsin Department of Transportation

 
1854 establishments in Wisconsin
Populated places established in 1854